Rayfield v Hands [1960] Ch 1 is a UK company law case, concerning the enforceability of obligations against a company.

Facts
Mr Rayfield sued the directors of Field Davis Ltd to buy his shares. Article 11 of the company’s constitution said ‘Every member who intends to transfer shares shall inform the directors who will take the said shares equally between them at a fair value.’ The directors were refusing to follow this rule, and Mr Rayfield sought an injunction.

Judgment
Vaisey J granted the injunction and held the article imposed an obligation on the directors, not as officers, but also in their capacity as members. He referred to Re Leicester Club and County Racecourse Co where Pearson J referred to directors as ‘working members of the company’ and that ‘they are doing their work in the capacity of members, and working members of the company’. He referred to the privity decisions of Denning LJ in Smith and Snipes Hall Farm Ltd v River Douglas Catchment Board and Drive Yourself Hire Co (London) Ltd v Strutt and also Carlill v Carbolic and The Satanita to say that the company did not need to be joined to the action to bring it, even though a members create a contractual relation with the company.

Authority
The case was approved by Scott J in Cumbrian Newspapers Group Ltd v Cumberland & Westmorland Herald Newspaper & Printing Co Ltd [1986] BCLC 286.

See also

UK company law
Capacity in English law
Agency in English law

Notes

References

United Kingdom company case law
High Court of Justice cases
1960 in case law
1960 in British law